Prinias is a village in the municipality of Agia. Before the 1997 local government reform it was a part of the community of Anavra. The 2011 census recorded 79 inhabitants in the village.

Population
According to the 2011 census, the population of the settlement of Prinias was 79 people, an increase of almost 32% compared with the population of the previous census of 2001.

See also
 List of settlements in the Larissa regional unit

References

Populated places in Larissa (regional unit)